Reerslev is a town in the Høje-Taastrup Municipality in northeast Zealand, Denmark. It is located 3.5 kilometers south of Hedehusene, 3.5 kilometers north of Tune and 27 kilometers west of Copenhagen. As of 2022, it has a population of 696.

References 

Cities and towns in the Capital Region of Denmark
Høje-Taastrup Municipality